Kesel is a surname. Notable people with the surname include:

Barbara Kesel (born 1960), American writer and editor of comic books
Herbert Kesel (1931–2011), German rower
Karl Kesel (born 1959), American comics writer and inker

See also
Kessel (surname)